Musa Nyatama (born 15 August 1987 in Benoni, Gauteng) is a South African football (soccer) midfielder who plays for Premier Soccer League club Swallows.

Personal life
Nyatama was born in Daveyton in Gauteng.

References

External links

1987 births
South African soccer players
Living people
Association football defenders
Association football midfielders
Thanda Royal Zulu F.C. players
Maritzburg United F.C. players
Mamelodi Sundowns F.C. players
Bloemfontein Celtic F.C. players
Orlando Pirates F.C. players
Highlands Park F.C. players
Moroka Swallows F.C. players
People from Daveyton
Sportspeople from Gauteng